Meilen Tu (traditional Chinese: 涂美倫, simplified Chinese: 涂美伦, Hanyu Pinyin: Tú Měilún) (born January 17, 1978) is a retired professional tennis player from the U.S. She has won one WTA Tour singles title, four WTA Tour doubles titles, four ITF Women's Circuit singles titles and three ITF Women's Circuit doubles titles.

Born in Tarzana, Los Angeles, California to Taiwanese parents, Tu was the US Open girls' singles champion in 1994. At the 2006 DFS Classic, she reached the semi-finals but lost to Vera Zvonareva, who then won the title.

Meilen was sponsored by French American premium activewear brand Loriet Sports throughout much of the second half of her career, where she reached her highest ranking in both Singles and Doubles.

Tu currently works as an agent for Topnotch Management, working closely with players such as Caroline Garcia and Zhang Shuai. Tu is married to Sam Sumyk, who formerly coached two-time grand slam champion Victoria Azarenka,  Vera Zvonareva and Garbiñe Muguruza.

WTA Tour finals

Singles 1

Doubles 10 (4–6)

References

External links
 
 
 

1978 births
Living people
American female tennis players
American sportspeople of Taiwanese descent
American sportswomen of Chinese descent
Taiwanese-American tennis players
People from Tarzana, Los Angeles
Tennis players from Los Angeles 
US Open (tennis) junior champions
Grand Slam (tennis) champions in girls' singles